The 1937 Orange Bowl was a college football postseason bowl game between the Mississippi State Maroons and Duquesne Dukes.

Background
A 5th-place finish in the Southeastern Conference was an upturn from 9th for the Maroons, in their first official bowl game (not counting the 1912 Bacardi Bowl). This was technically Duquesne's first bowl game, as their previous "postseason" bowl game was the 1933 Festival of Palms Bowl, also held in Miami.

Game summary
Ike Pickle scored first on a touchdown run to give the Maroons a 6-0 lead in the first quarter. Boyd Brumbaugh gave the Dukes a lead in the second quarter on his touchdown run, but Pee Wee Armstrong's pass to Fred Walters for a 40-yard touchdown made it 12-7 at halftime. Brumbaugh threw a 72-yard touchdown pass in the fourth quarter to Ernest Hefferle that proved to be the margin of victory as the Maroons' two missed extra points doomed the team.

Aftermath
The Maroons returned to the Orange Bowl four years later. Duquesne has not played in a bowl game since.

Statistics

References

Orange Bowl
Orange Bowl
Duquesne Dukes football bowl games
Mississippi State Bulldogs football bowl games
January 1937 sports events
Orange Bowl